Tall Beleki (also Romanized as Tall Belekī) is a village in Jowzar Rural District, in the Central District of Mamasani County, Fars Province, Iran. At the 2006 census, its population was 50, in 12 families.

References 

Populated places in Mamasani County